The Swiftsure International Yacht Race is the premier long distance sailing race in the Pacific Northwest and British Columbia area.  Starting and ending in Victoria, BC, Canada, the Swiftsure is international because the midpoint markers for the four long courses are in U.S. waters.  Organized by the Royal Victoria Yacht Club, the race occurs during the Memorial Day weekend in May with staggered starts on Saturday morning.   The race is most popular with sailors from British Columbia and Washington, but it has drawn boats from as far away as California, Hawaii, New Zealand, and even Russia.

Race courses

The nature of the course and the notoriously unpredictable winds and currents provide an exacting test of seamanship. Swiftsure consists of nine races over five courses (tabulated below) in the Strait of Juan de Fuca, including the Swiftsure Inshore Classic (formerly "Sookesure" then "Rosedale Rock") and "Classics" races.  Therefore, it offers wide appeal to the professional and experienced amateur sailor who takes pride in his or her boat, big or small.  In some years, light winds led to the race being dubbed the "Driftsure;" in other years, like 1971, 1979, and 2012, strong winds (up to 35 knots) led to boats dropping out or even being dismasted.

History
The first Swiftsure Lightship Classic Race took place in 1930.  Six vessels began in Cadboro Bay, raced out the Strait of Juan de Fuca to its mouth, rounded the lightship on Swiftsure Bank, and returned to Victoria.  From 1948-1950, the race began in Port Townsend, WA, and ended in Victoria. Beginning in 1951, the current long courses have remained; yachts start in Victoria, race to their rounding mark in the United States, finishing back in Victoria.

See also
 Vic-Maui Yacht Race

References

External links
Official Swiftsure website

Sailing competitions in Canada
Sports competitions in Victoria, British Columbia